Roland Magnenat (9 November 1922 – 8 October 1991) was a Swiss weightlifter. He competed in the men's bantamweight event at the 1952 Summer Olympics.

References

External links
 

1922 births
1991 deaths
Swiss male weightlifters
Olympic weightlifters of Switzerland
Weightlifters at the 1952 Summer Olympics
Place of birth missing